Bathocuproine is a derivative of 1,10-phenanthroline with two methyl groups and two phenyl groups in the 2,9 and 4,7 positions, respectively.  Like 1,10-phenanthroline, bathocuproine is a bidentate chelating ligand.  The two methyl groups flank the nitrogen centers, such that bathocuproine is a bulky ligand.  This compound, first prepared by Case and Brennan in the early 1950s  is a pale yellow solid that is soluble in polar organic solvents.

References

Chelating agents
Phenanthrolines